Stella Assange (née Sara González Devant; born 1983) is a lawyer and human rights defender. She was known as Sara Devant before changing her name several times: first to Stella Moris in 2012, later to Stella Moris-Smith Robertson, and finally to Stella Assange (due to her marriage to Julian Assange in 2022). She was born in South Africa, but holds Swedish and Spanish citizenship. Throughout her career, she has been an international advocate for human rights, most prominently in the case of her husband.

Early life and education 
Sara Gonzalez Devant was born in 1983 in Johannesburg, South Africa, to a Spanish mother and a Swedish father. Her mother is a theatre director and her father is an architect,  town planner, and artist. Both of Devant's parents were known for participating in the Medu Art Ensemble, an anti-apartheid artist collective in Botswana. Throughout her youth, Devant lived in Botswana, Lesotho, Sweden, and Spain. An impactful moment in Sara's life came when a family friend of the Devants, Thami Mnyele, was killed in a 1985 South African Defence Force raid into Gaborone. This act of state-sponsored killing left a defining impression on the Devant family.

After attending an international school in Lesotho, Devant proceeded to earn a degree in law and politics at SOAS University of London, a Master's of Science in refugee law at Oxford, and a Master's in public international law while studying at the Complutense University of Madrid.

Career 
Devant has authored a number of articles for the independent publisher and magazine, New Internationalist.

In 2011, Devant was hired by Julian Assange's legal team to help prevent his extradition to Sweden on sexual assault charges. These charges were eventually dropped.

For the sake of additional security while working with Julian Assange, Devant changed her name to Stella Moris in 2012. 

Stella has been on Assange's legal team throughout his captivity, including during his asylum period in the Ecuadorian Embassy in London and his incarceration in Belmarsh Prison. In reflecting on these legal battles, Stella noted that her multilingualism in Swedish and Spanish was indispensable when liasing with the Swedish and Ecuadorian authorities.

On October 10, 2022, Stella and thousands of others locked arms in a human chain around the Parliament of the United Kingdom to demand Assange's freedom and the cessation of any extradition attempts.

Personal life and marriage 
In 2015, Moris and Assange began a relationship and married in 2022. 

During Assange's seven-year period of political asylum in the Ecuadorian Embassy in London, the couple conceived two children in secret, the first being born in 2017, and the second in 2019. Tracy Somerset, Duchess of Beaufort and the rapper M.I.A. are the children's godmothers. 

On March 23, 2022, Stella married Julian Assange in a ceremony that took place in Belmarsh Prison.

References 

1983 births
Living people
Alumni of the University of Oxford
Swedish women lawyers
Spanish women lawyers
21st-century Swedish lawyers
Swedish expatriates in South Africa
21st-century Spanish lawyers
Julian Assange
Alumni of SOAS University of London
Spanish expatriates in South Africa
Complutense University of Madrid alumni